Javanese Surinamese are an ethnic group of Javanese descent in Suriname. They have been present since the late 19th century, when their first members were selected as  indentured laborers by the Dutch colonizers from the former Dutch East Indies.

History 

After the abolition of slavery, the plantations in Suriname needed a new source of labor. In 1890, the influential Netherlands Trading Society, owner of the plantation Mariënburg in Suriname, undertook a test to attract Javanese indentured workers from the Dutch East Indies. Until then, primarily Indian indentured workers from British India worked at the Surinamese plantations as field and factory workers. 
On 9 August, the first Javanese arrived in Paramaribo. The test was considered successful and by 1894 the colonial government took over the task of recruiting Javanese hands. They came in small groups from the Dutch East Indies to the Netherlands, and from there to Paramaribo. The transport of Javanese immigrants continued until 1914 (except 1894) in two stages through Amsterdam.

The workers came from villages in Central and East Java. Departure points were Batavia, Semarang and Tandjong Priok. The recruited workers and their families awaited their departure in a depot, where they were inspected and registered and where they signed their contract.

The immigrants were recruited to work on the plantations. The exception was a group in 1904, when 77 Javanese were recruited specifically to work at the Colonial Railways. From World War I Javanese also worked at the Suriname Bauxite Company in Moengo. Immigration continued until 13 December 1939. The outbreak of World War II ended transplantation schemes.

Population 
A total of 32,965 Javanese immigrants went to Suriname. In 1954, 8,684 Javanese returned to Indonesia, with the rest remaining in Suriname. The census of 1972 counted 57,688 Javanese in Suriname, and in 2004 there were 71,879. In addition, in 2004 more than 60,000 people of mixed descent were recorded, with an unknown number of part Javanese descent.

Diaspora 
In 1953, a large group of 300 families (1,200 people), led by Salikin Hardjo, went back to Indonesia on the ship Langkuas of the Royal Rotterdam Lloyd. They intended to settle in Java or Lampung, but their request was not approved by the Indonesian government, and instead they were sent to West Sumatra. They established the village of Tongar, also referred to as Tongass in Pasaman Regency, north of  Padang, clearing land and building new houses. They integrated smoothly with the Minangkabau community, despite the fact that most of the Javanese were Christian. Marriages with the mainly Muslim Minangkabau were common. The current generation is said to identify more as Indonesian than Surinamese, but still maintain contacts with family and friends in Suriname and the Netherlands, sometimes traveling to those countries.

In the 1970s, 20,000-25,000 Javanese Surinamese went to the Netherlands. They settled mainly in and around cities such as Groningen, Amsterdam, The Hague, Rotterdam, and Zoetermeer. They are well integrated into Dutch society, but preserve their Javanese identity through associations and regularly organized meetings. Most still have relatives in Suriname and send  remittances, and regularly visit Suriname.

Notable people 
 Karin Amatmoekrim, writer
 Reinier Asmoredjo, painter
 Maarten Atmodikoro, football player
 Sigourney Bandjar, football player
 Soeki Irodikromo, painter and ceramics artist
 Frits Karsowidjojo, politician
 Ranomi Kromowidjojo, swimmer
 Soerjani Mingoen-Karijomenawi, politician
 Willy Soemita, politician
 Virgil Soeroredjo, badminton player
 Paul Somohardjo, politician
 Mitchel Wongsodikromo, badminton player
 Sri Dewi Martomamat, Miss Suriname in Miss Supranational 2019
 Bruce Diporedjo, football Player
 Jeroen Lumu, football Player (Javanese-Surinamese mother)
 Darren Sidoel, football Player
 Edwin Soenarto
 Neraysho Kasanwirjo

References

Bersselaar, van den, D., H. Ketelaars, 1991, De komst van contractarbeiders uit Azië: Hindoestanen en Javanen in Suriname, Leiden, 
Breunissen, K., 2001, Ik heb Suriname altijd liefgehad: het leven van de Javaan Salikin Hardjo, Leiden, 
Bruin, de, H., 1990, Javanen in Suriname, Paramaribo
Derveld, F.E.R., 1982, Politieke mobilisatie en integratie van de Javanen in Suriname : Tamanredjo en de Surinaamse nationale politiek, Groningen: Bouma's boekhandel, ook verschenen als proefschrift Leiden, 
Grasveld, Fons en Klaas Breunissen, 1990, Ik ben een Javaan uit Suriname, Hilversum: Stichting Ideële Filmprodukties, 
Hardjomohamed, R., 1998, Javanese female immigrants in the historiography of Suriname, Suriname
Hoefte, R., 1990, De betovering verbroken: de migratie van Javanen naar Suriname en het rapport-Van Vleuten (1909), Dordrecht, 
Hoefte, R., 1998, In place of slavery: a social history of British Indian and Javanese laborers in Suriname, Gainesville, 
Jorna, E., 1985, "Naar een land van melk en honing?": Javaanse emigratie naar Suriname 1890-1917, Leiden, doctoraalscriptie
Kempen, M. van, 2003, 'Javanen'. In: Een geschiedenis van de Surinaamse literatuur. Breda: De Geus, pp. 197–209. (overzicht van de Surinaams-Javaanse orale literatuur)
Mangoenkarso, P.P., 2002, De eerste 94 Javanen op plantage Mariënburg in Suriname, Rijswijk
Mitrassing, F.E.M., 1990, Etnologische trilogie: Suriname: Creolen, Hindostanen, Javanen: gedenkschriften, Paramaribo
Mulder, K., 1987, Reserve-arbeid in een reserve-kolonie: immigratie en kolonisatie van de Javanen in Suriname 1890-1950, Rotterdam, doctoraalscriptie.
Six-Oliemuller, B.J.F.G., 1998, Aziaten vergeleken: Hindoestanen en Javanen in Suriname, 1870-1875, Leiden, doctoraalscriptie
Suparlan, P., 1995, The Javanese in Suriname: ethnicity in an ethnically plural society, Tempe
Vruggink, Hein i.s.m. John Sarmo, 2001, Surinaams-Javaans - Nederlands Woordenboek, KITLV Uitgeverij, Leiden, 
Waal Malefijt, de, A., 1963, The Javanese of Surinam, Assen
Waal Malefijt, de, A., 1960, The Javanese population of Surinam, Colombia
Wengen, van, G.D., 1975, The cultural inheritance of the Javanese in Surinam, Leiden, 
Winden, van der, Y., 1978, Javanen in Suriname: bibliografie van publicaties verschenen over de Javaanse bevolkingsgroep in Suriname, Den Haag

External links
Database with records of persons in 1890-1930 as an indentured worker from Java went to Suriname
www.javanenvansuriname.info 

Asian Surinamese
 
S
S
Ethnic groups in Suriname